Leggett is a surname. Notable people with the surname include:
Anne M. Leggett, American mathematician
Anthony James Leggett (b. 1938), theoretical physicist
Christopher Leggett, American film producer
Betty Leggett, American spiritualist and socialite
Jack Leggett (b. 1954), American college baseball coach
Jordan Leggett (b. 1995), American football player
Isiah Leggett (b. 1944), American politician from Maryland
Jay Leggett (1963–2013), American actor
Jeremy Leggett (b. 1954), British social entrepreneur and writer
Kimberley Leggett (b. 1993), Malaysian beauty pageant titleholder
Maurice Leggett (b. 1986), American football player
Mortimer Dormer Leggett (1821–1896), American Union Army general
Robert L. Leggett (1926–1997), U.S. Representative from California
Sidney Leggett, English footballer
Timothy Dalton Leggett (b. 1946), British actor 
Trevor Leggett (1914–2000), judoka, and writer on Zen and Yoga
Vanessa Leggett (b. 1968), American freelance journalist, author, lecturer and First Amendment advocate jailed for protecting sources
William Leggett (disambiguation), multiple people